Henry Allen Loveless (1854–1921) was a businessman and community leader in Montgomery, Alabama. He helped found the Dexter Avenue Baptist Church.

Biography
Henry Allen Loveless was born in Bullock County, Alabama in 1854.

Anderson S. Loveless was his brother. Booker T. Washington profiled Henry in the book The Negro in Business.

He died in Montgomery on August 8, 1921.

A school for African American students was named for him when it was established in Montgomery in 1923.

References

External links

1854 births
1921 deaths
19th-century American businesspeople
African-American businesspeople
19th-century African-American people
20th-century African-American people
Place of birth missing
People from Montgomery, Alabama
Businesspeople from Alabama